Possible (Pos) is a left-wing political party in Italy, launched in Rome on 21 June 2015. The party's founder is Giuseppe Civati, a former prominent member of the Democratic Party (PD). Possible's progressive platform is a mixture of social democracy, democratic socialism, green politics, liberalism and elements of participatory democracy.

Possible's logo, including an equals sign, refers to a fundamental issue for the party, equality, inflected in multiple fields such as the economy, conflict of interest, separation of powers, anti-sexism, LGBTI+ rights, and immigration. In late 2017, the party was a founding member of Free and Equal, a left-wing joint list for the 2018 general election, while it is currently part of the Greens and Left Alliance for the 2022 general election.

History
In May 2015, after months of tensions with Prime Minister and party secretary Matteo Renzi, Civati chose to leave the PD. Civati, who had lost a bid to become leader of the party to Renzi in 2013, had long accused the Prime Minister of being a right-winger and moving the PD to the right or toward a centrist "party of the nation".

Civati followed Luca Pastorino, a member of the Chamber of Deputies who was running, with Civati's support, for President in the 2015 Ligurian election and was instrumental in the defeat of the official Democratic candidate. Civati and Pastorino were joined by Elly Schlein, a member of the European Parliament sitting in the Socialists and Democrats' Group, and two more deputies, Andrea Maestri and Beatrice Brignone.

At Possible's launch, Civati explained that it was intended to "have minimum bureaucracy, and membership will be light, participatory, horizontal" and aimed at unifying all the parties, groups and individuals to the left of the PD, including Sergio Cofferati, Stefano Fassina, Nichi Vendola's Left Ecology Freedom (SEL), Maurizio Landini's Social Coalition, the Greens and other environmentalists, etc., in a single party, with a potential support around 10% of the vote. Also representatives of the Italian Radicals, Green Italia, the Communist Refoundation Party, Free Alternative (AL) and Italy Work in Progress (the latter two splinter groups from the Five Star Movement, M5S) showed up at Possible's first convention in Rome.

In the run-up of the party's second convention, to be held in July in Florence, some media hinted that five deputies who had left the M5S, four of whom affiliated to AL and one to SEL, and four senators, including the two of Italy Work in Progress, were on the verge of joining Possible, which was thus close to the formation of a group in the Senate. In the meantime, while being open to a joint party with Civati, the two senators of Italy Work in Progress joined The Other Europe.

As of November, Possible parted ways with most left-wing splinters of the PD, who had launched Future to the Left and joined Italian Left (SI), along with SEL and some left-wing splinters of the M5S. For his part, Civati looked interested in organising his party more "outside" than "inside the [political] palace". Consequently, Possible joined forces with AL, which was active also at the grassroots' level, and formed a joint sub-group within the Mixed Group of the Chamber. Shortly after, one deputy of AL, Toni Matarrelli, directly joined Possible, becoming its fifth deputy.

In January 2016 Civati was elected secretary of the party with 93.2% of the vote by party members.

Between February and March 2017 Mattarelli left the party to join the Democratic and Progressive Movement (MDP), along with splinters from the PD and SI, while Possible chose to sever its ties with AL and team up with SI instead, by forming a joint group in the Chamber.

In December 2017 Possible was a founding member, along with the MDP and SI, of Free and Equal (LeU), the left-wing joint list for the 2018 general election, which chose the President of the Senate and former anti-Mafia prosecutor Pietro Grasso as its leader and candidate for Prime Minister.

In March 2018, following the electoral result below expectations, Civati resigned from secretary. In May Brignone was elected to replace him with 73.9% of the vote by party members, prevailing over David Tozzo with 26.1%. Subsequently, the party quit from LeU, while Tozzo left Possible to remain in LeU.

In the run-up to the 2019 European Parliament election the party formed, along with the Federation of the Greens and Green Italia, Green Europe (EV).

In the run-up of the 2022 general election the party joined the Greens and Left Alliance (AVS), earlier formed by SI and EV.

Ideology
The party, a strong supporter of secularism, calls for a new plan on civil rights (including same-sex marriage, LGBT adoption, legalisation of cannabis and euthanasia), opposes austerity policies, while supporting redistributive ones aimed at a more egalitarian society and is a vocal proponent of environmentalism. Civati, who describes himself both as a social democrat and a liberal (or, more precisely, a "left-wing liberal"), is also known for his stance for a more competitive free market.

Possible's logo, including an equals sign, refers to a fundamental issue for the party, equality, inflected in multiple fields such as the economy, conflict of interest, separation of powers, anti-sexism, LGBT rights, and immigration.

The party's name is reminiscent of the slogan "Yes We Can", used by Barack Obama during the 2008 Democratic Party presidential primaries, "The party of possibilities", title of the motion supporting Civati in the 2013 Democratic Party leadership election, and Podemos, a kin political party in Spain.

Election results

Italian Parliament

European Parliament

Leadership
Secretary: Giuseppe Civati (2015–2018), Beatrice Brignone (2018–present)
Party Leader in the Chamber of Deputies: Giuseppe Civati (2015–2018), Luca Pastorino (2018)
Party Leader in the European Parliament: Elly Schlein (2015–2019)

References

External links

Official website of Giuseppe Civati
Official blog of Giuseppe Civati

2015 establishments in Italy
Political parties established in 2015
Democratic Party (Italy) breakaway groups
Democratic socialist parties in Europe
Feminist parties in Europe
Green political parties in Italy
Left-wing parties in Europe
Left-wing politics in Italy
LGBT political advocacy groups in Italy
Progressive parties in Italy
Social democratic parties in Italy
Socialist parties in Italy